Fabian Wilkens Solheim (born 10 April 1996) is a Norwegian alpine ski racer.

At the 2017 Junior World Championships he finished twelfth in the giant slalom. He made his FIS Alpine Ski World Cup debut in December 2018 in Val d'Isere, and collected his first World Cup points in January 2019 in Adelboden with a 22nd-place finish. At the world championships 2021 he was part of the team winning gold medals in the team event.

He represents the sports club IL Heming.

World Championship results

References

External links
 
 
 
 

1996 births
Living people
Alpine skiers from Oslo
Norwegian male alpine skiers
Alpine skiers at the 2022 Winter Olympics
Olympic alpine skiers of Norway
Medalists at the 2022 Winter Olympics
Olympic medalists in alpine skiing
Olympic bronze medalists for Norway